Vidarbha Hockey Association Stadium is a multi-purpose stadium in Nagpur, Vidarbha. The stadium was constructed and maintained by Vidarbha Hockey Association and also has Vidarbha Hockey Academy. The stadium is mainly used for field hockey and has synthetic AstroTurf.

References

External links 
 Maharashtra Online
 wikimapia

Field hockey venues in Maharashtra
Multi-purpose stadiums in India
Sports venues in Nagpur
Sport in Vidarbha
Year of establishment missing